Mikael Nilsson may refer to:

Mikael Nilsson (footballer, born 1967), Swedish footballer
Mikael Nilsson (footballer, born 1968), Swedish footballer (Swedish international in 1990s)
Mikael Nilsson (footballer, born 1978), Swedish footballer (Swedish international in 2000s)
"Mikael Nilsson", an alias given to Swedish musician Nattramn, which was once believed to be his real name